Neope niphonica is a member of the Nymphalidae butterfly family found in East Asia.

References

Elymniini
Butterflies of Japan
Butterflies described in 1881